Vila Seca may refer to:

Places

Portugal
 Vila Seca (Armamar), a civil parish in the municipality of Armamar
 Vila Seca (Barcelos), a parish in the municipality of Barcelos
 Vila Seca (Condeixa-a-Nova), a civil parish in the municipality of Condeixa-a-Nova

Spain
 Vila-seca, a municipality in the comarca of Tarragonès